Zordun Sabir (1937 – 13 August 1998) was a popular Uyghur author who is most known for his historical "Anayurt" (Homeland) trilogy.

Books
Zordun Sabir. Awral Shamalliri ("Wind of Awral"). Urumchi: Shinjang Xelq Neshriyati, 1980.
Zordun Sabir. Ata ("Father"). Urumchi: Shinjang Yashlar-Osmurler Neshriyati, 1994.
Zordun Sabir. Anayurt ("Homeland"). Almaty: Nash Mir, 2006.

Bibliography
Makhmut Muhămmăt, Qălbimdiki Zordun Sabir: ăslimă, Ürümchi : Shinjang Khălq Năshriyati, (2000)

1937 births
1998 deaths
Writers from Xinjiang
Uyghur writers
20th-century novelists